Chalky Island may refer to:

 Chalky Island (New Zealand)
 Chalky Island (Tasmania)
 Little Chalky Island, Tasmania